William Daniel Kinniburgh (born 8 September 1984, in Glasgow) is a retired footballer who was the manager with Gartcairn F. A. Juniors in the West of Scotland Football League. He has played in the Scottish Premier League for Motherwell and the Scottish Football League for Ayr United and Partick Thistle.

Career
Kinniburgh was a product of the Motherwell youth set-up and made his debut on 12 May 2002, against Dundee. On 15 November 2003, Kinniburgh signed for Ayr United on loan.

Kinniburgh joined Partick Thistle on loan in late 2007 and on 18 January 2008 was signed by them for an undisclosed fee. He scored his first and only goal for Partick in a 2–1 defeat to Falkirk in April 2011.

He joined Clyde on loan in January 2010, until the end of the season.

Kinniburgh terminated his contract at Thistle in May 2012 to pursue a career as a police officer and signed on a part-time basis for Scottish Junior West Region Junior champions Irvine Meadow the following month. In June 2013, he signed for fellow Junior club Cambuslang Rangers, however he left the club in January 2014. Kinniburgh signed for Thorniewood United in August 2014. After leaving Thorniewood, Kinniburgh signed for Largs Thistle in March 2015. He made five appearances for the club before leaving in the summer by mutual consent.

Kinniburgh made six appearances for the Scotland U-21 team in his early career.

After spending time as a coach with Partick Thistle, Kinniburgh became manager of junior side Gartcairn F. A. Juniors. He left the club in 2022.

Personal life
His younger brother Steven is also a professional footballer, currently caretaker manager of Corby Town.

Career statistics 
Correct as 7 June 2011

References

External links

1984 births
Officers in Scottish police forces
Living people
Motherwell F.C. players
Ayr United F.C. players
Partick Thistle F.C. players
Clyde F.C. players
Irvine Meadow XI F.C. players
Cambuslang Rangers F.C. players
Footballers from Glasgow
Scottish footballers
Association football defenders
Scottish Premier League players
Scottish Football League players
Scottish Junior Football Association players
Scotland under-21 international footballers
Sportspeople from East Kilbride
Scottish police officers
Footballers from South Lanarkshire
Thorniewood United F.C. players